Kilvelur block is a revenue block in the Kilvelur taluk of Nagapattinam district, Tamil Nadu, India. There are a total of 51 panchayat villages in this block.

References 
 

Revenue blocks of Nagapattinam district